Sokndal is the southernmost municipality in Rogaland county, Norway. It is located in the traditional district of Dalane. The administrative centre of the municipality is the village of Hauge. Other villages in Sokndal include Li, Rekefjord, Sogndalsstranda, and Åna-Sira.

Sogndalsstranda is a picturesque, old fishing village, which may have inspired the municipality in becoming Norway's first member of Cittaslow. The Jøssingfjorden, known for the Altmark Incident, is also located in Sokndal.

The  municipality is the 267th largest by area out of the 356 municipalities in Norway. Sokndal is the 219th most populous municipality in Norway with a population of 3,281.

General information

The parish of Soggendal (later Sokndal) was established as a municipality on 1 January 1838 (see formannskapsdistrikt law). In 1845, the small lading place of Sogndal (population: 348) was separated from Sokndal as a municipality of its own. This left Sokndal with 2,819 residents. On 12 December 1868, a small part of Sokndal (population: 41) was transferred to neighboring Eigersund municipality. On 1 July 1944, the small lading place of Sogndal (population: 311) was reincorporated into Sokndal. In 1947, a small area in Sokndal (population: 7) was transferred to Eigersund. On 1 January 1967, the Tjørn farm (population: 10) was transferred from Eigersund to Sokndal.

Name
The Old Norse form of the name was Sóknardalr. The first element is the genitive case of the river name Sókn (now Sokno) and the last element is dalr which means "valley" or "dale". The river name is derived from the Old Norse verb sœkja which means "seek" and so the meaning is "the river which seeks (finds/forces) its way". Before 1918, the name was written "Sogndal" or "Soggendahl".

Coat of arms
The coat of arms was granted on 8 July 1988. The arms show three black pickaxes on a yellow background. These were chosen to symbolize the importance of mining and agriculture in the municipality. It was designed by Johan Digernes of Haugesund.

Churches
The Church of Norway has one parish within the municipality of Sokndal. It is part of the Dalane prosti (deanery) in the Diocese of Stavanger.

Geography
The municipality is the southernmost in Rogaland county. The North Sea lies to the south and west, the river Sira and the Åna fjord lie to the southeast (separating it from Flekkefjord in Agder county), the municipality of Lund lies to the east and north, and the municipality of Eigersund lies to the northwest. The lakes Grøsfjellvatnet and Eiavatnet both lie on the northern border of the municipality. The coastline of Sokndal is fairly smooth, although there are two larger fjords which cut into the municipality: the Rekefjorden and Jøssingfjorden. The Lille Presteskjær Lighthouse marks the entrance to the Rekefjorden. The southeastern part of the municipality is very rocky and rugged. It is the site of the large Tellnes mine, a large producer of titanium.

Climate

Economy

At Tellnes, just east of Hauge i Dalane, there is an ilmenite mine run by Titania AS, supplying 10% of the world production of ilmenite (a type of titanium). It's also the world's largest opencast ilmenite mine.

Government
All municipalities in Norway, including Sokndal, are responsible for primary education (through 10th grade), outpatient health services, senior citizen services, unemployment and other social services, zoning, economic development, and municipal roads. The municipality is governed by a municipal council of elected representatives, which in turn elect a mayor.  The municipality falls under the Sør-Rogaland District Court and the Gulating Court of Appeal.

Municipal council
The municipal council of Sokndal is made up of 21 representatives that are elected to four year terms. Currently, the party breakdown is as follows:

Notable people 
 Carl Adolph Dahl (1769 at Aave in Rekefjord – 1819) a Norwegian jurist and politician 
 Hans Reidar Holtermann (1895 in Sokndal - 1966) a military officer, commanded of Hegra Fortress in WWII
 Rolf Johan Lenschow (1928 in Hauge i Dalane – 2014) a Norwegian civil engineer and professor in concrete construction
 Frank Tønnesen (born 1972 in Sokndal) stage name Tønes, a Norwegian singer-songwriter and guitarist
 Vibeke Stene (born 1978 in Sokndal) a Norwegian gothic metal soprano and actress 
 Siri Seglem (born 1983 in Sokndal) a handball player with 23 caps with Norway women

References

External links

Municipal fact sheet from Statistics Norway 
Sokndal 
A presentation of Sokndal Municipality
cittaslow.no
Google map satellite views:
 Hauge i Dalane, also clearly visible is the large rock quarry on both sites of the Rekefjord.
 The Titania open pit mine (top right) and the Jøssingfjord (bottom left)

 
Municipalities of Rogaland
1838 establishments in Norway
Cittaslow